Ronald Rolston (born October 14, 1966) is an American ice hockey coach who is currently Associate Head Coach at Providence College. He was previously the head coach of the Buffalo Sabres of the National Hockey League.

He has served as head coach of USA Hockey's National Team Development Program and was an assistant hockey coach at Boston College, Harvard University, Clarkson University, and Lake Superior State University, as well as head coach of the AHL team, the Rochester Americans.

On February 20, 2013, Rolston was named as the interim head coach of the Sabres, replacing Lindy Ruff, for the remainder of the 2012–13 season. On May 7, 2013, the Sabres announced they were removing the interim tag from Rolston and officially named him the 16th head coach in franchise history. Amid poor performance at the start of the 2013-14 season and a change in direction by ownership, the Sabres dismissed Rolston from his post on November 13, 2013.  On September 17, 2014, the Coyotes announced they had hired Rolston as a pro scout.  On June 18, 2015, the Coyotes announced that Rolston had been promoted to head coach of their AHL affiliate, the Springfield Falcons.

Playing career
Rolston played 3 years with Michigan Technological University, scoring 32 goals and 68 points in 110 games.

Coaching career

NHL coaching statistics

Career highlights
 Guided the Amerks to a 36-26-10-4 record and a berth in the Calder Cup Playoffs in 2011-12, his first season behind the Rochester bench
 A 2011 Bob Johnson Award recipient, which recognizes excellence in international competition during a season
 Winningest coach in the history of USA Hockey's Nation Team Development Program (NTDP)
 A three-time gold-medal winner at the International Ice Hockey Federation U-18 World Championships in 2005, 2009 and most recently in 2011
 During the 2010-11 season, he led Team USA to titles in the 2011 Five Nations Tournament and in the 2010 Four Nations Cup
 Led the U.S. National Under-17 team to the 2009-10 campaign World Hockey Challenge title, its first since 2002
 In 2008-09, led the U.S. National Under-18 Team to first-place finishes at both the 2008 Men's Under-18 Four Nations Cup in Lake Placid, N.Y., and 2009 Under-18 Five Nations Tournament in Sweden
 Also served as HC coach for the U.S. National Junior Team on two occasions, helping Team USA to a bronze medal at the 2007 IIHF World Junior Championship in Sweden
 Led Team USA to a silver medal at the 2007 IIHF U-18 tournament
 Won NCAA National Championships in 1992 and 1994 with Lake Superior State University, a team he also guided to three straight appearances in the NCAA National Championship game and four CCHA tournament titles in his five-year stint
 Perhaps the most decorated coach in NTDP history, Rolston-led teams have never missed the championship game in either of the major NTDP tournaments, the World Under-17 Hockey Challenge and International Ice Hockey Federation World Under-18 Championship. In the 4 IIHF U-18 Championships that he his teams have competed in, they have brought home 3 golds and a silver medal. 
In July 2011, he was hired by the Buffalo Sabres to be the head coach of their affiliate team, the Rochester Americans in the American Hockey League .
In February 2013, named interim head coach of the Sabres after the firing of Lindy Ruff.
Officially named head coach of the Sabres on May 7, 2013, removing the interim tag. He was fired from Buffalo on November 13, 2013.

Personal
Rolston and his wife, Shannon, have two children, Maeve and Ronan. He is the older brother of Brian Rolston.

References

External links 
 Official biography Providence Friars

1966 births
Living people
American ice hockey coaches
American men's ice hockey left wingers
Boston College Eagles men's ice hockey coaches
Buffalo Sabres coaches
Harvard Crimson men's ice hockey coaches
Ice hockey coaches from Michigan
Michigan Tech Huskies men's ice hockey players
People from Fenton, Michigan
Rochester Americans coaches
Sportspeople from Metro Detroit
Winston-Salem Thunderbirds players
Ice hockey players from Michigan